Ik hou van Holland (English: I love Holland) is a Dutch game show, presented by Linda de Mol. It is broadcasting during prime time, on Saturday nights on RTL4. The show tests Dutch celebrities on their knowledge of the Netherlands.
Present day it is taken over by SBS and will broadcast a new season from September 2019.

The show opened with the tune of the tango song after which it was named, "Ik hou van Holland", by Willy Schootemeijer. The song, sung in Dutch, was a hit in the 1930s for the Austro-Hungarian tenor Joseph Schmidt and, in the early 1970s, by the Dutch boy singer Heintje (his version is used in the theme song)

Format 
The series was contested by two teams, captained by Jeroen van Koningsbrugge and Guus Meeuwis. Formerly, Beau van Erven Dorens (season 1-3) and Peter Heerschop (season 4-6) were team captains. Every episode there are new celebrity team members.

The goal was to win as many points as possible by answering questions about Dutch culture and spelling relatively difficult Dutch words correctly, among other challenges.

The format of the show was the basis for the BBC 1 show I Love My Country, first broadcast in August 2013.

Play rounds 
The important rounds are, in order of play:
 TV questions
 Guessing a song's title and performer
 Mr. Hoi Chi Cheung (season 4&6)
 Songs with pictures (since season 4)
 Translating (since season 5)
 What we know about the country (season 2-3)
 What does he ask? (season 4)
 "In Holland staat een huis" (± "There's a house in Holland", after the Dutch children's song) (only during the Koninginnedag-special of 2009)
 Dutch language
 Spell a word
 Guessing a difficult Dutch word (season 1-4)
 Chinese whispers (since season 5)
 What shall we eat? (season 1)
 Guessing well-known Dutchman/Dutchwoman
 The lists
 Topography
 Dutchman of the year (only during the New Year's Eve of 2008)
 Sports and news questions (RTL fragments during the 'Viert 20 jaar RTL' special & Sinterklaas fragments during the Sinterklaas special of 2009) (only sports questions: season 1-3)
 Final (spin the wheel: since season 2)

Seasons

Specials

References

External links
 

2008 Dutch television series debuts
Dutch game shows
Television series by Endemol
RTL 4 original programming